Decameron Nights is a 1924 British-German silent drama film directed by Herbert Wilcox and starring Lionel Barrymore, Ivy Duke and Werner Krauss. It is based on the novel Decameron by Giovanni Boccaccio.

Cast
 Lionel Barrymore as Saladin
 Ivy Duke as Perdita
 Werner Krauss as Soldan
 Bernhard Goetzke as Torello
 Randle Ayrton as Ricciardo
 Xenia Desni as Lady Teodora
 Jameson Thomas as Imliff
 Hanna Ralph as Lady Violante
 Albert Steinrück as King Algarve

Production
Herbert Wilcox had previously made Chu Chin Chow in Germany with Eric Pommer. Pommer invited Wilcox back to make another film. UFA would provide the story, screenplay and cast plus 50% of the finance. Wilcox would produce and direct, bring in American and British stars and 50% of the finance. Wilcox signed Ivy Duke from Britain and Lionel Barrymore from the US. They arrived in Berlin a few days before filming was to start. Wilcox loved the sets and the story but felt the script "stank to high heaven". Wilcox would only proceed if they could move forward without a script and write scenes from day to day.

Critical reception
Wilcox later wrote that "I got through the film on schedule, and whatever faults could be found with Decameron Nights they were not in the screenplay or continuity. The critical acclaim was extraordinary and in my view out of proportion to the merits of the film."

In The New York Times, Mordaunt Hall  wrote, "Decameron Nights, as it comes to the screen, is a tedious pictorial story with some good scenic effects and at least two good performances. The whole subject, however, lacks any suggestion of dramatic value, and one may therefore find time to ponder on many things that are not in the least connected with the picture...Werner Krauss figures as the Soldan and Lionel Barrymore plays the Soldan's son, Saladin. The narrative includes a slothful account of the Soldan's wish, or, rather, his command, that Saladin marry the daughter of the King of Algrave. Saladin, who, although he is begemmed and turbaned, does very much the same thing that sons do in this day—he falls in love with another girl, Perdita, and the old Soldan is so furious that, after kissing his son, he stabs the young man. And that ends the yarn. Mr. Barrymore does what he is able in the circumstances, but his work is not brilliant. Mr. Krauss acts exceedingly well, but most of his manoeuvrings are far from interesting."

See also
Lionel Barrymore filmography

References

Wilcox, Herbert, Twenty Five Thousand Sunsets, 1967

External links

1924 films
1920s English-language films
Films based on works by Giovanni Boccaccio
Films of the Weimar Republic
Films directed by Herbert Wilcox
Films set in the Middle Ages
British silent feature films
German silent feature films
UFA GmbH films
1920s historical drama films
German historical drama films
British historical drama films
British black-and-white films
The Decameron
Films produced by Erich Pommer
German black-and-white films
1924 drama films
English-language German films
1920s British films
Silent drama films
1920s German films